The Pont d'Austerlitz is a bridge which crosses the Seine River in Paris, France. It owes its name to the battle of Austerlitz (1805).

Location
The bridge links the 12th arrondissement at the rue Ledru-Rollin, to the 5th and 13th arrondissements, at the Jardin des Plantes.

History 

The construction of the bridge came from a necessity to link the Faubourg Saint-Antoine on the right bank to the Jardin des Plantes on the left bank.  At the beginning of the 19th century the first bridge was constructed. In 1801, the engineer Becquey de Beaupré proposed a five-arched bridge.  In 1854, the bridge was judged dangerous and the width was increased to 18 meters (59 feet) and finally to 30 meters (98 feet).

Characteristics

 Type : Arch bridge
 Construction : 1801–1805, 1854 and 1884–1885
 Inauguration : 1854 and 1885
 Architects : Alexandre Michal, Jules Savarin (1854) – Jean-Marie-Georges Choquet (1885)
 Material : Stone Masonry
 Total Length : 173,80 m

Access

See also 

 List of crossings of the River Seine
 New Bridge, Mitrovica

Austerlitz
Buildings and structures in the 12th arrondissement of Paris
Buildings and structures in the 5th arrondissement of Paris
Buildings and structures in the 13th arrondissement of Paris